Davis Roberts (born Robert A. Davis, March 7, 1917 – July 18, 1993) was an American character actor whose career spanned five decades, from the late 1940s until just before his death in 1993. He started out making films in the 1940s and 1950s and expanded into television work in the following decades. Davis was known for his dignified portrayals which were often in contrast to prevailing stereotypical roles. He played the role of Dr. Caldwell in three episodes in the second and third seasons of the NBC-TV sitcom series Sanford and Son, and as Dr. Ozaba in the 1968 episode "The Empath" in the original Star Trek series.

He was active off-screen as well, serving several terms on the western advisory board of Actors' Equity Association. As one of the officers of Beverly Hills-Hollywood Branch of the NAACP he helped present the first Image Awards in 1967.

Death
Davis died in the home of his brother Charles on July 18, 1993 of emphysema at the age of 76.

Filmography

References

External links 

1917 births
1993 deaths
Activists for African-American civil rights
American male television actors
American male film actors
Actors from Mobile, Alabama
Respiratory disease deaths in Illinois
Deaths from emphysema
African-American male actors
20th-century American male actors
20th-century African-American people